Marco Gavelli (25 April 1915 – 15 October 1995) was an Italian wrestler. He competed at the 1936 Summer Olympics and the 1948 Summer Olympics.

References

External links
 

1915 births
1995 deaths
Italian male sport wrestlers
Olympic wrestlers of Italy
Wrestlers at the 1936 Summer Olympics
Wrestlers at the 1948 Summer Olympics
People from Faenza
Sportspeople from the Province of Ravenna
20th-century Italian people